Hasameli (also Hašamili) was the Hittite god of metalworkers and craftsmen. Associated with smoke, he is called on by Mursili II in his Annals to encircle and cloak him that he be concealed from his enemy in a covert assault. He may be related with the Greek Hephaestus.

See also

 Hittite mythology

Hittite deities